Babni Vrt (in older sources also Babin Vrt) is a small settlement in the Municipality of Kranj in the Upper Carniola region of Slovenia.

Name
Babni Vrt was attested in historical sources as Babenwort between 1205 and 1208, Waben garten and Wabinwart in 1444, and Babeygartt in 1481, among other spellings.

References

External links
Babni Vrt on Geopedia

Populated places in the City Municipality of Kranj